Madras Lalitangi Vasanthakumari (popularly referred to as MLV) (3 July 1928 – 31 October 1990) was a Carnatic musician and playback singer for film songs in many Indian languages. MLV and her contemporaries D. K. Pattammal and M. S. Subbulakshmi are popularly referred to as the female trinity of Carnatic Music. A prime disciple of G. N. Balasubramaniam, she was the youngest among the established musicians of that era, and was the youngest female to receive the Sangita Kalanidhi award. In 1967, she was honored with the Padma Bhushan, the third highest civilian award by the government of India. Her daughter, the late K.Srividya, was an actress in Tamil and Malayalam languages.

As well as being a much sought-after playback singer for films, MLV popularized unfamiliar ragas, and her Ragam Thanam Pallavis were considered cerebral. Additionally, she popularized the compositions of the Haridasas. Her most famous disciples include Srividya (her daughter), Sudha Raghunathan, Charumathi Ramachandran, A. Kanyakumari, Yogam Santhanam, V. Kaveri, Rose Muralikrishnan, Meena Subramanian and Yamuna Arumugam.

Early life
MLV was born to a musical family. Her father, Kuthanur Ayya Swamy Iyer, was a noted musician. Her mother, Lalithangi, was also a musician. When Deshbandhu Chittaranjan Das died in 1925, Lalithangi came out with a song as a tribute to his patriotism. A rare gramophone record of her rendition of this song is said to be in V. Sundaram's possession.

MLV's school education was in Madras, in a convent, where she was set to pursue a medical career until Carnatic musician G. N. Balasubramaniam became her guru. In her own words, "My parents had rendered yeomen service to Carnatic music. They were mainly instrumental in popularising the compositions of Purandara Dasa in South India. They were not keen that I should enter the music field and gave me general education. But in the musical atmosphere of my house, I had ample opportunity of practising vocal music. Once G. N. Balasubramaniam heard me sing and he prevailed upon my parents to place me under his tutelage. It was he who was responsible for the status I occupy in the music world today."

Learning Carnatic music
MLV learnt Carnatic music from G. N. Balasubramaniam (GNB). She was also GNB's first disciple.

Performing and recording career

MLV made her debut in 1940, at 12 years old, by accompanying her mother at a recital. Two years later, she gave a solo recital in Bengaluru. She also cut her first 78 rpm disc. From then on, her career took on a geometric progression, as a stage artiste, and by 1950 she had established herself as a front-ranker. A music critic said that MLV brought the struggle of women in the world of music to a successful culmination. Her music was said to have more male characteristics than that of any other female musician.

Her own musical style
MLV imbibed much of GNB's style, but did not make a fetish of speed and struck out on her own, evolving an inimitable style of her own.

While MLV was known more for her cerebral style, rather than her emotional one, this was compensated for by her rich and original manodharma. Similar to GNB, she was said to be a genius in her tricky, instantaneous brilliant manodharma. Indira Menon comments, "MLV did adopt her Guru's idea of a quick impressionistic sketch of the raga covering the two octaves at the start, but settled down to a reposeful elaboration, unfolding it gradually with her virtuosity in the form of BRIGA - CASCADES appearing only where necessary. She was careful not to carry to an excess what her versatile voice was capable of."

MLV's mastery over vocal techniques was comprehensive and complete. She could render several difficult ragas, with her alapana and kalpana swaras, suitably embellished with shruthi-bheda. Her listeners had the same ecstatic experience when she sang and more particularly when in a lightning manner she shifted gracefully from the melodic world of one raga in one pitch to another raga in another pitch. In this context, one has to refer to raga combinations like Shanmukhapriya-Sankarabharanam, Bhairavi-Kamas, Abhogi-Valaji to illustrate this point.

In GNB's own words,"Vasanthi typifies real discipleship – she absorbs all, but presents her own glorious creations."

Purandaradasa Tradition
Lalithangi, MLV's mother, had a vast repertoire of Purandaradasa kritis. She passed on this tradition to her daughter, MLV. As a result, like T. Brinda who brought Kshetrayya Padams to the public platform and M. S. Subbalakshmi who brought Annamacharya kritis to the public arena, MLV popularized the Devaranamas of Purandaradasa.

Sindhubhairavi
She popularized the composition 'Kalyana Gopalam', composed by Narayana Teertha, in raga Sindhubhairavi. She also popularized the composition, 'Venkatachala Nilayam' by Purandaradasa in the same raga. Hindustani maestro Bade Ghulam Ali Khan was generous in his praise for her music. Sudha Ragunathan mentions, "MLV Amma has told me that it was Bade Ghulam Ali Khan Saab who taught her the nuances of Sindhu Bhairavi in the Hindustani style."

Ragam Thanam Pallavi
MLV's forte was Ragam Tanam Pallavi, where she not only maintained the tradition brought to the stage by D. K. Pattammal, but enriched it in her own unique way. A. Kanyakumari who had accompanied MLV on violin for almost two decades says, "MLV akka had a sharp mind and good memory and I have never seen her practice a song or a ragam or for that matter a ragam-tanam-pallavi also before a concert." Sudha Ragunathan, a prime disciple of MLV, remarked that "In all my twelve years of learning under her, I had never seen Amma practicing at home. But, to my great surprise, she would compose a Pallavi in the car on the way to the concert!"

Playback Singing
By 1946, MLV was also a playback singer. Her first big hit was in the 1951 film Manamagal, where she sang the song Ellam Inbamayam in Ragamalika, and Subramania Bharathiyar's evergreen composition, Chinnanchiru Kiliyae. In the 1960 film Raja Desingu, MLV also sang another Ragamalika, Parkadal Alaimele, which was well received, and later became popular in Bharatha Natyam recitals. In later years, MLV would also sing these songs towards the end of her Carnatic music concerts, and today, many musicians often include them in their repertoire.

MLV also sang Ayya Saami in the 1951 film, Or Iravu. This song was based on the song Gore Gore from the film Samaadhi, which was in turn based on the Latin American song Chico Chico from Puerto Rico, from the film Cuban Pete. In the 1952 film Thayullam, MLV sang Konjum Purave which was based on the famous Hindi song, Thandi Havayen.

Other songs MLV sang include Adisayam Vanathu Arivumayam, Senthamarai Kannanae, Vanna Tamizh and Adum Arul Jothi in the films Vikramadithian, Vairamalai and Sornakili. Incidentally, each of these songs contained the raga Kalyani and were also well received.

MLV sang the Dashaavataara song for Bhookailas like Munneeta Pavalinchu Naagashayana, while Kamala Kumari danced in a classical way. She sang for films until 1970.

Personality
As one of the top ranking stage artistes, MLV was noted for her charm, grace, warmth, self-restraint and humility. Her self-restraint as an artist can be understood from her own words: Brigas in fast tempo should adhere to the shruthi and above all, true music must touch the listener's heart. MLV however maintained a philosophy: A concert is a daily test of the caliber of a musician. A slight lapse may let the musician down and a constant vigil is essential.

Accompanists
Mridangam maestro Palghat Mani Iyer made an exception to the decision he had made early in his career not to accompany a female performer and accompanied her in concerts. MLV helped her ot istrstis including Mannargudi Easwaran, Srimushnam V. Raja Rao, Seerkazhi J. Skandaprasad, Thiruvarur Bakthavathsalam, R. Ramesh, Karaikudi Krishnamurthy, G. Harishankar (kanjira), Dwaram Mangathayaru (Violin) And Kannyakumari (Violin) and more, establishing them by encouraging them and giving them opportunities to accompany her in concerts.

Family
MLV married Kalaimamani Vikatam R.Krishnamurthy in the year 1951. They had a son, K. Shankarraman and Srividya.

Disciples
MLV taught her daughter K.Srividya, who at the age of ten was ready to perform and sang very much like MLV. Srividya however, wanted to pursue a career in the film industry, and went on to become a notable actress in Indian films.

By coincidence, Srividhya made her Acting Debut in a Tamil Movie as a Concert Vocalist. It was her Mother MLV who sang for Srividhya.The Asaveri Raga Krithi MLV sang for Daughter Srividhya to mouth in the film, and it would have been equally in place in a Concert in December Season

MLV trained several other students, and many of them are the top-ranking musicians today. Some of the notable musicians who have studied under MLV include Sudha Ragunathan, Yogam Santhanam, Charumathi Ramachandran, Rose Muralikrishnan, V. Kaveri, Vanaja Narayanan, T. M. Prabhavathi, Sankari Krishnan, Meena Subramaniam, Jayanthi Sridharan, Jayanthi Mohan, Bama Visveswaran and Nirmala Srinivasan . She also taught music at Rishi Valley School started by Jiddu Krishnamurti and Yamuna Aarumugam who was a Malaysian government scholar went under the 'Gurukulavasam' system to her for two entire years.

Saraswathi Srinivasan (b 1936) was the first disciple of MLV. After marriage also Saraswathy Srinivasan jointly with MLV gave some concerts.

Awards

Death 
She died in 1990 at the age of 62 due to cancer, and was stoic about the suffering she faced in the last year of her life.

Playback singer

She was a much sought after playback singer from the late 1940s until the mid-1960s.

Music composers she sang for 
She worked under C. R. Subburaman, S. M. Subbaiah Naidu, G. Ramanathan, S. Dakshinamurthi, K. V. Mahadevan, Vedha, V. Nagayya, Pendyala Nageshwara Rao, T. Chalapathi Rao, Viswanathan–Ramamoorthy, S. Rajeswara Rao, R. Sudarsanam, R. Govardhanam, T. R. Pappa, S. V. Venkatraman, Kunnakudi Venkatrama Iyer, G. Aswathama, T. A. Kalyanam, M. S. Gnanamani, C. N. Pandurangan, C. S. Jayaraman, G. Govindarajulu Naidu, T. G. Lingappa, K. G. Moorthy, Ghantasala, Master Venu, G. Aswathama, V. Dakshinamoorthy, G. Devarajan, K. Raghavan and Shankar–Jaikishan.

Playback singers she sang with
She sang duets mostly with Thiruchi Loganathan, Seerkazhi Govindarajan and A. M. Rajah. Others are M. K. Thyagaraja Bhagavathar, V. N. Sundaram, T. R. Mahalingam, T. A. Mothi, C. R. Subburaman, C. S. Jayaraman, Ghantasala, G. K. Venkatesh, T. M. Soundararajan, P. B. Sreenivas, K. S. George, V. Dakshinamoorthy and K. J. Yesudas.

She also sang duets with female singers with most notably with P. Leela & N. L. Ganasaraswathi. Others are A. P. Komala, T. S. Bagavathi, Soolamangalam Rajalakshmi, Jikki, T. V. Rathnam, Radha Jayalakshmi, P. A. Periyanayaki, P. Bhanumathi, K. Jamuna Rani and A. G. Rathnamala.

References

External links
 

Women Carnatic singers
Carnatic singers
Recipients of the Padma Bhushan in arts
Sangeetha Kalanidhi recipients
Singers from Chennai
Performers of Hindu music
Tamil playback singers
1928 births
1990 deaths
Tamil singers
Indian women classical singers
20th-century Indian singers
Recipients of the Sangeet Natak Akademi Award
Indian women playback singers
20th-century Indian women singers
Women musicians from Tamil Nadu